Talty is a city in Kaufman County, Texas, United States. Its population was 1,535 at the 2010 census, and in 2019 the estimated population was 2,760.

Incorporated on May 1, 1999, as the Town of Talty, the name was formally changed to City of Talty in 2015.

Don Willett, a judge on the United States Court of Appeals for the Fifth Circuit and former Texas Supreme Court justice, is from Talty.

Geography

Talty is located in northwestern Kaufman County at  (32.692066, –96.397845). Interstate 20 passes through the town, with access from Exit 493. I-20 leads east  to Terrell and west  to Interstate 635 southeast of Dallas.

Demographics

As of the 2020 United States census, there were 2,500 people, 713 households, and 679 families residing in the town.

Education
Talty is served by Forney Independent School District.

Almost all of Talty is zoned to Henderson Elementary School (in unincorporated Kaufman County), while a very small portion is zoned to Claybon Elementary School (Forney).

Warren Middle School (in unincorporated Kaufman County), and Forney High School (Forney) serve  Talty students.

References

External links
 Official website

Dallas–Fort Worth metroplex
Cities in Kaufman County, Texas
Cities in Texas
Populated places established in 1999
1999 establishments in Texas